God or Goddess, in MUDs, often refers to an administrator of a MUD server, most typically the owner.  Sometimes multiple individuals with the title of God are present, or the term may even be applied to all administrative and development staff, but it is usual for the term to refer to the most senior administrator.  A similar term, mostly used in DikuMUDs, is implementer, or "imp".

Where the term is used in this sense, the God or Gods will most often be supervising staffers referred to as wizards or immortals.

The appearance of entities referred to as "gods" in a MUD does not necessarily mean that this usage of the word is being applied; the word's ordinary usage is also frequently in evidence, referring to non-player character gods or even non-administrative player character gods.

History
Historically the term God was not the original usage for either the player end game or sysadmin status in MUDs with Rob Roy Trubshaw and Richard Bartles seminal 1978 and 1985 MUD1 & 2 using Wizard (MUD). many contemporary games of the era such as Shades (1985), Mirrorworld (1986) also using Wizard or Arch Wizard. The first apparent use was in the 1988 Lap of the Gods authored by Ben Laurie although its original non commercial version was released in 1985.

Avalon: The Legend Lives in 1989 evolved this concept even further pioneering the introduction of player Gods associated with stylised spheres (Stars, War, Fire etc.) with fully developed structural religious systems including player priests, followers and methods of prayer and offering. The gods are appointed not by amassing treasure or points but via either competitive ordination, often player vs player ordination or through dominance or merit within the game-world. Importantly as noted by Richard Bartle Avalon was the first to pioneer this concept of player gods in that they remained within the fiction of the world rather than as sysadmins. To date Avalon has competitively Ordained ten gods and appointed a variety of others, the first in 1989 and the last in 2015.

Power dynamics
Discussion of MUD Gods frequently touches on the absolute power individuals assuming this title typically have over the virtual environment.  A common conflict in MUDs occurs between an administrator who uses this power in an arbitrary and capricious fashion and others who believe standards of fairness should be upheld.  MUD-related works often warn prospective players against annoying a God, citing the lack of behavioral constraint on this sort of figure.

References

MUD terminology